Marcos Antonio García Nascimento (born October 21, 1979 in Franca, Brazil), better known as Nasa, is a Brazilian footballer who currently plays for Luverdense Esporte Clube. He spent most of his career at foreign countries including Japan, Mexico, Uruguay and Chile.

Club statistics

External links
 

 Profile at BDFA 
 kyotosangadc
 

1978 births
Living people
Brazilian footballers
Brazilian expatriate footballers
Liga MX players
J1 League players
J2 League players
Kyoto Sanga FC players
Albirex Niigata players
Defensor Sporting players
Rampla Juniors players
Peñarol players
Atenas de San Carlos players
Deportes Concepción (Chile) footballers
Querétaro F.C. footballers
Uruguayan Primera División players
Expatriate footballers in Chile
Brazilian expatriate sportspeople in Mexico
Expatriate footballers in Uruguay
Brazilian expatriate sportspeople in Chile
Brazilian expatriate sportspeople in Uruguay
Expatriate footballers in Japan
People from Franca
Association football midfielders
Footballers from São Paulo (state)